"50/50 Luv" is the 1995 debut single by rappers B.G. Knocc Out & Dresta from their debut album Real Brothas.

Lyrics and music 
The lyrics deal with the street life, how it has changed people and turned friends against each other. It is also considered a dedication to Eazy-E.

The song contains an interpolation of "When Somebody Loves You Back" by Teddy Pendergrass.

Track listing
"50/50 Luv" (LP Version) – 4:31
"50/50 Luv" (Radio Edit) – 3:46
"50/50 Luv" (Instrumental) – 5:00
"D.P.G./K" (LP Version) 3:54

Chart performance
The song peaked at number 68 on the Hot R&B/Hip-Hop Singles & Tracks chart, number 27 on the Hot Rap Singles chart and number five on the Bubbling Under R&B/Hip-Hop Singles chart.

References

External links 

1995 debut singles
1995 songs
Gangsta rap songs
G-funk songs
Songs written by Kenny Gamble
Songs written by Leon Huff